The Qing conquest theory proposes that the actions and policies of the Manchu-led Qing dynasty held China back, and led to the Great Divergence in which China lost its early modern economic and industrial lead over the West. The theory seeks to explain why Europe could experience an industrial revolution, but China did not. Theory supporters, some of whom may be motivated by anti-Qing sentiment, claim that advances in science and technology and economic development in the Song and Ming dynasties moved China toward a modern age, however, the restrictions placed on commerce and industry and the persecution of non-orthodox thought after the transition from Ming to Qing in the 17th century caused China to gradually stagnate and fall behind the West.

Background
Different dates are offered for the beginning or end of ascendency and whether it was in economic, technological, or political terms. Some see the Qing as the time when China fell behind, either because of stagnation or because Europe or the West pulled ahead. The economic historian Angus Maddison calculates that in the tenth century China was the "world's leading economy in terms of per capita income," and that "between the fifteenth and eighteenth centuries economic leadership passed from China to Western Europe." Carl Dahlman and Jean-Eric Aubert of the World Bank argue, based on Maddison's data, that China was the world's largest and most advanced economy for the most of the past two millennia and among the wealthiest and most advanced economies until the 18th century. Maddison believes that China's lead did not happen until the fall of the Roman Empire and that China lost its lead because Europe pulled ahead, not because of domestic conditions.  In a review of the field in 2006, the Harvard economic historian David Landes began by stating that "as late as the end of the first millenium of our era, the civilizations of Asia were well ahead of Europe in wealth and knowledge," but five hundred years, that is, in the early years of the Ming dynasty, later "the tables had turned."  

The economic historian Mark Elvin, drawing on the work of Japanese historians,  argues that the Song dynasty (960–1279), experienced a revolution in agriculture, water transport, finance, urbanization, science and technology, but that China was then caught in a high level equilibrium trap. Others claim that the Song dynasty economic revolution brought proto-industrialization with large increases in per capita income as well as industrial and agricultural output. Some scholars have termed the phenomenon China's "medieval urban revolution".

The Mongol conquest inflicted a large population loss and devastated the economy but the succeeding Ming dynasty brought a recovery in per capita incomes and economic output, surpassing Song dynasty heights. Late Ming laissez-faire policies such as nonintervention in markets and low taxes further stimulated commercialisation, as market agriculture replaced subsistence farming. Wage labour became increasingly common, as large-scale private industry developed, displacing indentured labor and often buying out government workshops. Historian Robert Allen estimates that family incomes and labor productivity of the Ming-era Yangtze Delta Region, the richest province of China, was far higher than contemporary Europe and exceeded the later Qing dynasty.

Some contend that economic and social developments during the late Ming paralleled the development of Europe in the 18th and the 19th centuries and that China would have entered a modern age had there been no Manchu conquest and no Qing dynasty. The Ming regime was ideologically rigid but cities and new wealth allowed room for intellectual fervor and liberalization. New thinkers like Wang Yangming and Li Zhi challenged orthodox Confucianism and argued that the words of Confucius and Mencius were fallible and that wisdom was universal. They also questioned government power over the economy and personal rights. Scholars of the Donglin school protested increases in government taxation during the Wanli Emperor, and restrictions on freedom of speech, advocating a program similar to classical liberalism. Ming dynasty scholars also investigated western science, such as Archimedes.

Evidence
Supporters of the theory hold that the policies of the Qing dynasty slowed China's economic and scientific advancement and allowed Western nations to surpass China. Specific Qing policies cited include suppression of creative thought, literary persecution, discouragement of foreign trade, repressive domestic policies, rigid neo-Confucian emphasis on ideology rather than practical knowledge, disrespect for business and commerce, destructive fiscal and tax policy, as well as the devastation of the initial conquest itself.

Restrictions on foreign trade 
Supporters most often point to Qing restriction on foreign trade as evidence of the theory. During the Ming dynasty, considerable commerce existed between China, Japan and Western Europe, estimated by Joseph Needham at nearly 300 million taels of silver from 1578 to 1644 (for comparison, the total Ming state revenues were from 20 to 30 million taels).

However, during the Qing dynasty, foreign trade was prohibited completely from 1644 to 1683, and it later restricted to only one port at Guangzhou. In addition, commerce had to be conducted by 13 guilds approved by the government, with competition prohibited.

The government also refused to provide protection to overseas Chinese. The emperor did not protest the massacres carried out by the Spanish and Dutch colonial authorities against the Chinese, such as what happened in the Spanish Philippines.

Restoration of serfdom
The restoration of serfdom is cited as another policy that greatly hampered the Chinese economy. Qing forces expropriated huge amounts of land, turning millions of people from tenant farmers into hereditary serfs. The amount of land requisitioned amounted to nearly 16 million mou, or nearly 10,666 km2, of farmland. Serfdom was so common in the early Qing that slave markets were set up to buy and sell those who had been enslaved during the Qing expansion.

Literary persecution 
While literary persecution existed in China prior to Qing rule, it was rare and never widespread. During the late Ming dynasty, protests by scholars forced the government to declare that "speech will not be criminalized". However, the Qing government frequently used literary persecution to destroy opposition to Qing rule. Several cases of literary persecution saw hundreds of intellectuals and their families executed, often for minor offenses such as referring to Manchus as "barbarians" and using the Qing character in areas that was deemed offensive by the government. Thousands of ancient texts deemed subversive were burned in the persecutions. Protests by scholars, which had been common during the late Ming period, were also suppressed.

The persecutions extended to non-orthodox thought as well; scholars who disagreed with the standard Neo-Confucian theories were executed along with a scientist who argued that the brain, rather than the heart, was the centre of thought.

Domestic intervention
The Qing dynasty intervened in the economy far more than its predecessors. Unlike the Ming dynasty, who had adopted laissez-faire policies, there was frequent intervention in the economy by restricting the number of merchants allowed to operate. The official edicts discouraged the cultivation of commercial crops, in favour of subsistence agriculture. Also, most new mines were prohibited.

Supporters of the theory claim that such policies greatly damaged the Chinese economy.

Devastation of initial conquest
The Ming-Qing transition was one of the most devastating wars in Chinese history, and it set back Chinese progress decades. Examples of the devastation include the Yangzhou massacre in which some 800,000 people, including women and children, were massacred by the Manchus. Whole provinces, such as Sichuan and Jiangnan, were thoroughly devastated and depopulated  by the Manchu conquest, which killed an estimated 25 million people. Some scholars estimate that the Chinese economy did not the regain the level reached in the late Ming dynasty until 1750, nearly a century after the foundation of the Qing dynasty. According to economic historian Robert Allen, family incomes in the Yangtze delta, China's richest province, was actually below Ming levels in 1820 but equal to that of contemporary Britain.

The destructive effects of the Qing were felt economically for decades. In the 1690s, Tang Chen (陈唐), a retired Chinese scholar and failed merchant wrote:
More than fifty years have passed since the founding of the [Qing] dynasty, and the empire grows poorer each day. Farmers are destitute, artisans are destitute, merchants are destitute, and officials too are destitute. Grain is cheap, yet it is hard to eat one’s fill. Cloth is cheap, yet it is hard to cover one’s skin. Boatloads of goods travel from one marketplace to another, but the cargoes must be sold at a loss. Officials upon leaving their posts discover they have no wherewithal to support their households. Indeed the four occupations are all impoverished!

Criticism
Kenneth Pomeranz rejects the assertion that "certain Asian societies were headed toward an industrial breakthrough until Manchu or British invaders crushed the 'sprouts of capitalism'". However, he suggests that the Qing "revitalization of the state" may have impeded the growth of fashion.

See also
 Economic history of China before 1912

References

Sources

 

Qing dynasty
Case studies